Viaduct Quarry is a 0.3 hectare geological Site of Special Scientific Interest near Shepton Mallet on the Mendip Hills in Somerset, notified in 1984.

This disused quarry is a Geological Conservation Review site identified as the best exposed and thickest section in the Downside Stone, a localised limestone development which accumulated adjacent to the Lower Jurassic Mendip Island.

See also
 Quarries of the Mendip Hills

Sources
 English Nature citation sheet for the site (accessed 9 August 2006)

External links
 English Nature website (SSSI information)

Sites of Special Scientific Interest in Somerset
Sites of Special Scientific Interest notified in 1984
Geology of Somerset
Quarries in the Mendip Hills